Diploglossus fasciatus, the banded galliwasp, is a species of lizard of the Diploglossidae family. It is found in Brazil, Bolivia, and Peru.

References

Diploglossus
Reptiles described in 1831
Reptiles of Brazil
Reptiles of Bolivia
Reptiles of Peru
Taxa named by John Edward Gray